Dwarigeria (also written as Dwari Geria) is  a  census town in the Garhbeta III CD block in the Medinipur Sadar subdivision of the Paschim Medinipur district in the state of West Bengal, India.

Geography

Location

Area overview
Paschim Medinipur district (before separation of Jhargram) had a total forest area of 1,700 km2, accounting for 14.31% of the total forested area of the state. It is obvious from the map of the Midnapore Sadar subdivision, placed alongside, is that there are large stretches of forests in the subdivision. The soil is predominantly lateritic. Around 30% of the population of the district resides in this subdivision. 13.95% of the population lives in urban areas and 86.05% lives in the rural areas.

Note: The map alongside presents some of the notable locations in the subdivision. All places marked in the map are linked in the larger full screen map.

Demographics
According to the 2011 Census of India, Dwarigeria had a total population of 7,754, of which 3,932 (51%) were males and 3,822 (49%) were females. There were 911 persons in the age range of 0–6 years. The total number of literate persons in Dwarigeria was 5,492 (80.26% of the population over 6 years).

.*For language details see Garhbeta III#Language and religion

Infrastructure
According to the District Census Handbook 2011, Paschim Medinipur, Dwarigeria covered an area of 1.9686 km2. Among the civic amenities, it had 4 km roads with open drains, the protected water supply involved overhead tank, tap water from treated sources, borewell, tubewell. It had 1,350 domestic electric connections, 18 road lighting points. Among the medical facilities it had 2 medicine shops. Among the educational facilities it had were 2 primary schools, 1 secondary school, 1 senior secondary school. Dwarigeria has a leaf plate plant. It has branch offices of 1 nationalised bank, 1 private commercial bank, 1 cooperative bank.

Healthcare
Dwarigeria Rural Hospital, with 30 beds at Dwarigeria, is the major government medical facility in the Garhbeta III CD block.

References

Cities and towns in Paschim Medinipur district